The 2006 United States Senate election in California was held November 7, 2006. Incumbent Democratic U.S. Senator Dianne Feinstein won re-election to her third full term.

Feinstein stood against Republican Dick Mountjoy, who had never held a statewide elected position, but had been a state senator for several years. Also running was Libertarian Michael Metti, Don Grundmann of the American Independent Party, Todd Chretien of the Green Party and Marsha Feinland of the Peace and Freedom Party.

Because California is a state that requires a large amount of money to wage a competitive statewide campaign, it is not unusual - as was the case for this race - for a popular incumbent to have no significant opponent. Several prominent Republicans, such as Bill Jones, Matt Fong, and others, declined to run, and a previously announced challenger, businessman Bill Mundell, withdrew his declaration after determining he would not be a self-funded candidate (like Michael Huffington was in the 1994 election).

Primaries 
Link to primary results

Democratic

Green

Others

Candidates

Democratic Party 
 Dianne Feinstein, incumbent U.S. Senator, former Mayor of San Francisco

Lost in primary
 Martin Luther Church, retired program manager
 Colleen Fernald, artist and entrepreneur

Republican Party 
 Richard Mountjoy, former State Senator, former State Assemblyman and candidate for Lieutenant Governor in 1998

American Independent Party 
 Don J. Grundmann, chiropractor

Green Party 
 Todd Chretien, writer

Lost in primary
 Tian Harter, green activist and a 1992 Congressional nominee
 Kent Mesplay, environmental activist, air quality inspector, and candidate for President in 2004

Libertarian Party 
 Michael Metti, businessman and perennial candidate

Peace and Freedom Party 
 Marsha Feinland, state party chair, socialist activist, and retired teacher

General election

Controversy 
On September 22, the Los Angeles Times reported that Mountjoy's official biography, as found on his campaign website, falsely asserted that he had served aboard the battleship USS Missouri during the Korean War—he'd actually served aboard the heavy cruiser USS Bremerton.  A review of the ships' logs corroborated this and the website was quickly changed to reflect his service aboard the Bremerton rather than the Missouri.

Predictions

Polling

Results 
Feinstein won the election easily. Feinstein won almost every major populated area winning in, Los Angeles, San Francisco, Sacramento, and San Diego. Feinstein was projected the winner right when the polls closed at 11 P.M. EST.

Results breakdown 
Final results from the Secretary of State of California.

See also 
 2006 United States Senate elections

References

External links 
 JoinCalifornia 2006 General Election
 SmartVoter.org page on the California Senate race.

Campaign websites (Archived)
 Dianne Feinstein
 Dick Mountjoy
 Michael Metti
 Todd Chretien
 Tian Harter
 Marsha Feinland

2006
California
United States Senate